FK Rosoman 83 is a football club based in the village of Rosoman, near Kavadarci, North Macedonia. They are currently competing in the Macedonian Third League (South Division).

History
The club was founded in 1983.

In club's history Rosoman 83 competed in the Macedonian Second League. On 24 April 2020, 26-year old club captain Sashko Gelov died of his injuries sustained in a car accident a few days earlier.

References

External links
Club info at MacedonianFootball 
Football Federation of Macedonia 

Football clubs in North Macedonia
Association football clubs established in 1983
1983 establishments in the Socialist Republic of Macedonia
FK